Moshe Arbel (born 1983) is an Israeli Haredi rabbi and politician. He currently serves as a member of the Knesset for Shas.

Biography
Arbel was born to Ilana and Rahmim. His father was deputy chairman of the Petah Tikva religious council and a Shas activist. He was educated at the Sha'arit Yisrael Talmud Torah and the Nahlat David yeshiva. During his national service in the Israel Defense Forces he served in a Home Front Command unit for identifying casualties. He was subsequently ordained as a rabbi, and went on to study law at Ono Academic College. He was a legal intern at Ramla court and carried out reserve duty as a military prosecutor in the Judea and Samaria office of the Military Advocate General.

Between 2006 and 2013 he was director of the Keter Shalom institute. During the term of the nineteenth Knesset (2013–2015), he worked as a legal advisor to the Shas party and for MK Yoav Ben-Tzur. He was placed on the honorary sixty-fifth place on the Shas list for the 2015 Knesset elections. In 2018 he was appointed temporary head of the Ministry of Religious Services due to the illness of minister David Azulai.

In the build-up to the April 2019 Knesset elections he was placed seventh on the Shas list,  and was elected to the Knesset as the party won eight seats.

Arbel is married with four children and lives in Petah Tikva.

References

External links

1983 births
Living people
21st-century Israeli lawyers
Haredi rabbis in Israel
Reichman University alumni
Israeli Haredim
Israeli Jews
Jewish Israeli politicians
Members of the 21st Knesset (2019)
Members of the 22nd Knesset (2019–2020)
Members of the 23rd Knesset (2020–2021)
Members of the 24th Knesset (2021–2022)
Members of the 25th Knesset (2022–)
Ono Academic College alumni
People from Petah Tikva
Rabbinic members of the Knesset
Shas politicians